Shramik Vikas Sangathan (SVS) is a trade union in the state of Kerala, India, founded in October 2016. It is the labour wing of the Aam Aadmi Party.

References 

Trade unions in Kerala
Trade unions in India
Aam Aadmi Party
2016 establishments in Delhi
Trade unions established in 2016